Oniscus is a genus of woodlice. It comprises five species, three of which are confined to northwestern Iberia (Oniscus ancarensis, O. galicianus and O. lusitanicus), one to the Pyrenees (Oniscus simonii), and one of which, O. asellus, is widespread across Europe and has been introduced to the Americas .

References

Woodlice
Isopod genera
Taxa named by Carl Linnaeus